The Suncorp Super Netball Player of the Year Award is an annual Suncorp Super Netball award recognising the person considered to be the best netballer in each season of the competition. The current holder of the award is Jhaniele Fowler, who is currently the only player in the league to have won the award on more than occasion.

Unlike similar awards in rival codes, where umpires are responsible for voting for a player, the NNL Player of the Year is voted on by the players, coaches and high-performance staff of the competition.

Winners

References

Player